Multi-linear algebra is a sub-field of mathematics that extends the methods of linear algebra. Just as linear algebra being built on the concept of a vector and develops the theory of vector spaces, multi-linear algebra builds on the concepts of p-vectors and multivectors with Grassmann algebras.

Origin
In a vector space of dimension n, vectors are used in most cases. However, according to Hermann Grassmann and others, this presumption misses the complexity of considering the structures of pairs, triplets, and general multi-vectors. With several combinatorial possibilities, the space of multi-vectors has 2n dimensions. The abstract formulation of the determinant is the most immediate application. Multi-linear algebra also has applications in the mechanical study of material response to stress and strain with various moduli of elasticity. This practical reference led to the use of the word tensor, to describe the elements of the multi-linear space. The extra structure in a multi-linear space has led it to play an important role in various studies in higher mathematics. Though Grassmann started the subject in 1844 with his Ausdehnungslehre, which was also republished in 1862, his work was to find acceptance, as ordinary linear algebra provided sufficient challenges to comprehension.

The topic of multilinear algebra is applied in some studies of multivariate calculus and manifolds where the Jacobian matrix comes into play. The infinitesimal differentials of single variable calculus become differential forms in multivariate calculus, and their manipulation is done with exterior algebra.

After Grassmann, developments in multilinear algebra were made in 1872 by Victor Schlegel when he published the first part of his System der Raumlehre, and by Elwin Bruno Christoffel. A major advance in multilinear algebra came in the work of Gregorio Ricci-Curbastro and Tullio Levi-Civita (see references). It was the absolute differential calculus form of multilinear algebra that Marcel Grossmann and Michele Besso introduced to Albert Einstein. The publication in 1915 by Einstein of general relativity explaining the precession of the perihelion of Mercury established multilinear algebra and tensors as important mathematics in physics.

Use in algebraic topology
Around the middle of the 20th century, tensors were reformulated more abstractly. The Bourbaki group's treatise Multilinear Algebra was especially influential—in fact, the term multilinear algebra may have originated there.

One reason at the time was a new area of application, homological algebra. The development of algebraic topology during the 1940s gave additional incentive for the development of a purely algebraic treatment of the tensor product. The computation of the homology groups of the product of two topological spaces involves the tensor product; but only in the simplest cases, such as a torus, is it directly calculated in that fashion (see Künneth theorem). The topological phenomena were subtle enough to need better foundational concepts; technically speaking, the Tor functors had to be defined.

The material to organize was quite extensive, including also ideas going back to Hermann Grassmann, the ideas from the theory of differential forms that had led to de Rham cohomology, as well as more elementary ideas such as the wedge product that generalizes the cross product.

The resulting rather severe write-up of the topic, by Bourbaki, entirely rejected one approach in vector calculus (the quaternion route, that is, in the general case, the relation with Lie groups), and instead, applied a novel approach using category theory, with the Lie group approach viewed as a separate matter. Since this leads to a much cleaner treatment, there was probably no going back in purely mathematical terms. (Strictly, the universal property approach was invoked; this is somewhat more general than category theory, and the relationship between the two as alternate ways was also being clarified, at the same time.)

Indeed, what was done is almost precisely to explain that tensor spaces are the constructions required to reduce multilinear problems to linear problems. This purely algebraic attack conveys no geometric intuition.

By re-expressing problems in terms of multilinear algebra, there is a clear and well-defined "best solution": the constraints the solution exerts are exactly those needed in practice. In general there is no need to invoke any ad hoc construction, geometric idea, or recourse to co-ordinate systems. In the category-theoretic jargon, everything is entirely natural.

Topics in multilinear algebra 
The subject matter of multilinear algebra has evolved less than the presentation down the years. Here are further pages centrally relevant to it:

Bilinear operator
Component-free treatment of tensors
Cramer's rule
Dual space
Einstein notation
Exterior algebra
Exterior derivative
Geometric algebra
Inner product
Kronecker delta
Levi-Civita symbol
Metric tensor
Mixed tensor
Multilinear map
Multilinear form
Symmetric algebra, Symmetric power
Symmetric tensor
Tensor
Tensor algebra, Free algebra
Tensor contraction

There is also a glossary of tensor theory.

Applications
Some of the ways in which multilinear algebra concepts are applied:

Classical treatment of tensors
Dyadic tensor
Bra–ket notation
Geometric algebra
Clifford algebra
Pseudoscalar
Pseudovector
Spinor
Outer product
Hypercomplex number
Multilinear subspace learning

References